Tom "Bushy" Bush (born 25 January 1990) is an English rugby league footballer who has played in the 2010s.

Background
Tom Bush was born in England, he trained as an apprentice plumber on a part-time basis, and as of 2012 he has works with his father John as a plumber and a plasterer for the A&T Heating Services (named after John and Kathy Bush's sons Andrew and Tom).

Playing career
Bush made his début for the Leeds Rhinos, and scored a try in the 62-4 victory over the Harlequins RL in the Super League at Headingley Rugby Stadium, Leeds on Saturday 6 March 2010.

References

External links 
 Leeds Rhinos profile
 Tom Bush makes Hunslet switch
 Leeds Rhinos: Tom Bush interview
 Knights new arrival Tom Bush could be a gem
 Keith Senior charged for referee outburst after Melbourne defeat
 Leeds Rhinos 10 Hull KR 17: Hull KR finally end run by beating depleted Rhinos

1990 births
Living people
English rugby league players
Hunslet R.L.F.C. players
Leeds Rhinos players
Rugby league fullbacks
Rugby league wingers
York City Knights players